Bonk's Return is a platform video game that was released for mobile phones in November 2006 in the United States, and was developed by Two Tribes and published by Hudson Soft. It is a mobile title in the Bonk series.

References

2006 video games
Bonk (series)
Mobile games
Hudson Soft games
Video games developed in the Netherlands

Single-player video games